Angry Birds Star Wars is a discontinued puzzle video game, a crossover between the Star Wars franchise and the Angry Birds series of video games, launched on November 8, 2012, first for Windows, iOS, and Android devices, later also to Mac and BlackBerry. The game is the sixth Angry Birds game in the series. The characters are copyrighted from George Lucas's double-trilogy. On July 18, 2013, Rovio announced that Angry Birds Star Wars would be heading for the PlayStation 3, PlayStation Vita, Xbox 360, Wii, Wii U, and the Nintendo 3DS on October 29, 2013, in conjunction with Activision. As of August 2013, the game has been downloaded over 100 million times on its various platforms. The game is a launch title for the PlayStation 4 and Xbox One.

On July 15, 2013, Rovio announced a sequel, entitled Angry Birds Star Wars II. It is based on the Star Wars prequel trilogy and the television show Star Wars Rebels. Angry Birds Star Wars II was released on September 19, 2013. Angry Birds Star Wars was discontinued on February 3, 2020 along with Angry Birds Rio and Angry Birds Star Wars II, with the games also being pulled out of app stores.

Gameplay

The game combines elements of both Angry Birds and Angry Birds Space, featuring levels that take place on both standard terrain and in outer space. The game begins on Tatooine, Anakin Skywalker and Luke Skywalker's home desert planet, moves to the Death Star I in parallel with A New Hope, travels to Hoth, then Cloud City in parallel with The Empire Strikes Back, and eventually ends up with Endor and Death Star II in parallel with Return of the Jedi. With the exclusion of Blue Bird, all the Birds are given new powers not yet seen before in a canon Angry Birds title, some of these that are upgraded as the game progresses further. Players can replay previously completed levels with the upgraded abilities.

Differences from other games are that Birds may still perform their chosen abilities a split second after colliding with an object. The Millennium Falcon is called the Mighty Falcon and used instead of the Mighty Eagle found in previous games. When a certain number of stars are earned, the player gets a reward. It can be either 5 Mighty Falcons (an item that may be used during normal levels to try to earn badges) or access to a Golden Droid level. There are additional bonus levels if the player manages to hit golden droids in selected levels. On June 13, 2013, power-ups were added.

There was a Facebook version of Angry Birds Star Wars that included weekly tournaments in addition to some story levels. It closed down on March 3, 2014.

Discontinuation

In December 2019, Rovio announced that Angry Birds Star Wars was discontinued on February 3, 2020
Alongside Angry Birds Star Wars II, Angry Birds Space and Angry Birds Rio. The game was pulled from App Store and Google Play.

Reception

The game has received favorable reviews with a Metacritic score of 88/100 based on 22 reviews. Mark Brown of Pocket Gamer gave the title a Gold Award, praising the game for being "faithful to the source material" and "filled with content". Justin Davis of IGN says it is a great game with Star Wars references and Force powers, and has a huge variety of perfectly tuned stages.

In a 2013 poll on the Rovio website, the game collected the most votes for favorite Angry Birds game. The Facebook version has garnered a lot of positive response as well.

At the 2013 Webby Awards, Angry Birds Star Wars was awarded as the "Best Game" from both the Judges and as the People's Choice. The game also earned a pair of nominations for Best Video Game from the Nickelodeon Kids' Choice Awards and the British Academy Children's Awards (BAFTA Kid's Vote).

References

External links

 

2012 video games
Activision games
LucasArts games
Android (operating system) games
Star Wars
BlackBerry 10 games
BlackBerry PlayBook games
Crossover video games
Delisted digital-only games
Facebook games
IOS games
Kinect games
MacOS games
Nintendo 3DS games
Nintendo 3DS eShop games
Nintendo Network games
PlayStation 3 games
PlayStation 4 games
PlayStation Move-compatible games
PlayStation Vita games
Products and services discontinued in 2020
Puzzle video games
Star Wars video games
Symbian games
Video games developed in Finland
Wii games
Wii U games
Wii U eShop games
Windows games
Windows Phone games
Xbox 360 games
Xbox One games
Rovio Entertainment games
Exient Entertainment games
Multiplayer and single-player video games